"Almighty dollar" is an idiom often used to satirize obsession with material wealth, or with capitalism in general. The phrase implies that money is a kind of deity.

History
Although the phrase "almighty dollar" was not popularized until the 1900s, similar phrases had been used much earlier. For example, the British writer Ben Jonson wrote in 1616:

The "dollar" version of the phrase is commonly attributed to Washington Irving, who used it in the story "The Creole Village," first published in the 1837 edition of The Magnolia, a literary annual:

Charles Dickens used the phrase in Chapter III, "Boston", of his American Notes, published in 1842.

Edward Bulwer-Lytton is often credited with coining the related phrase "pursuit of the almighty dollar", which he used in his 1871 novel The Coming Race. More obscure uses of the phrase can be found as far back as 1852.

In popular culture
"The Almighty Dollar" is the name of a 2007 Ozzy Osbourne song from his album Black Rain. The song argues that money and greed are destroying the planet by blinding people to problems such as global warming and pollution.

"Almighty Dollar" is the name of a Devin the Dude song from his 2007 album Waitin' to Inhale. It is a lament both of a marijuana user's lack of money and the declining buying power of the US dollar.

The words "Almighty Dollar" are repeated in the 1973 funk hit single "For the Love of Money" by The O'Jays. The song cautions against the intense desire for money and the negative effects that such desire can have on a person's personality and actions.

The phrase "Almighty Dollar" is repeated many times in the song "Money (In God We Trust)" by the funk metal band Extreme.

Notes

References

Dollar
English phrases
1830s neologisms
Washington Irving
Edward Bulwer-Lytton